Amoxicillin is an antibiotic medication used to treat a number of bacterial infections. These include middle ear infection, strep throat, pneumonia, skin infections, and urinary tract infections among others. It is taken by mouth, or less commonly by injection.

Common adverse effects include nausea and rash. It may also increase the risk of yeast infections and, when used in combination with clavulanic acid, diarrhea. It should not be used in those who are allergic to penicillin. While usable in those with kidney problems, the dose may need to be decreased. Its use in pregnancy and breastfeeding does not appear to be harmful. Amoxicillin is in the beta-lactam family of antibiotics.

Amoxicillin was discovered in 1958 and came into medical use in 1972. Amoxil was approved for medical use in the United States in 1974, and in the United Kingdom in 1977. It is on the (WHO) World Health Organization's List of Essential Medicines. It is one of the most commonly prescribed antibiotics in children. Amoxicillin is available as a generic medication.  In 2020, it was the 40th most commonly prescribed medication in the United States, with more than 15million prescriptions.

Medical uses

Amoxicillin is used in the treatment of a number of infections, including acute otitis media, streptococcal pharyngitis, pneumonia, skin infections, urinary tract infections, Salmonella infections, Lyme disease, and chlamydia infections.

Acute otitis media
Children with acute otitis media who are younger than six months of age are generally treated with amoxicillin or other antibiotics. Although most children with acute otitis media who are older than two years old do not benefit from treatment with amoxicillin or other antibiotics, such treatment may be helpful in children younger than two years old with acute otitis media that is bilateral or accompanied by ear drainage. In the past, amoxicillin was dosed three times daily when used to treat acute otitis media, which resulted in missed doses in routine ambulatory practice. There is now evidence that two times daily dosing or once daily dosing has similar effectiveness.

Respiratory infections
Amoxicillin and amoxicillin-clavulanate have been recommended by guidelines as the drug of choice for bacterial sinusitis and other respiratory infections. Most sinusitis infections are caused by viruses, for which amoxicillin and amoxicillin-clavulanate are ineffective, and the small benefit gained by amoxicillin may be overridden by the adverse effects.
Amoxicillin is recommended as the preferred first-line treatment for community-acquired pneumonia in adults by the National Institute for Health and Care Excellence, either alone (mild to moderate severity disease) or in combination with a macrolide. The World Health Organization (WHO) recommends amoxicillin as first-line treatment for pneumonia that is not "severe". Amoxicillin is used in post-exposure inhalation of anthrax to prevent disease progression and for prophylaxis.

H. pylori
It is effective as one part of a multi-drug regimen for treatment of stomach infections of Helicobacter pylori. It is typically combined with a proton-pump inhibitor (such as omeprazole) and a macrolide antibiotic (such as clarithromycin); other drug combinations are also effective.

Lyme borreliosis
Amoxicillin is effective for treatment of early cutaneous Lyme borreliosis; the effectiveness and safety of oral amoxicillin is neither better nor worse than common alternatively-used antibiotics.

Skin infections
Amoxicillin is occasionally used for the treatment of skin infections, such as acne vulgaris. It is often an effective treatment for cases of acne vulgaris that have responded poorly to other antibiotics, such as doxycycline and minocycline.

Infections in infants in resource-limited settings
Amoxicillin is recommended by the World Health Organization for the treatment of infants with signs and symptoms of pneumonia in resource-limited situations when the parents are unable or unwilling to accept hospitalization of the child. Amoxicillin in combination with gentamicin is recommended for the treatment of infants with signs of other severe infections when hospitalization is not an option.

Prevention of bacterial endocarditis
It is also used to prevent bacterial endocarditis and as a pain-reliever in high-risk people having dental work done, to prevent Streptococcus pneumoniae and other encapsulated bacterial infections in those without spleens, such as people with sickle-cell disease, and for both the prevention and the treatment of anthrax. The United Kingdom recommends against its use for infectious endocarditis prophylaxis. These recommendations do not appear to have changed the rates of infection for infectious endocarditis.

Combination treatment
Amoxicillin is susceptible to degradation by β-lactamase-producing bacteria, which are resistant to most β-lactam antibiotics, such as penicillin. For this reason, it may be combined with clavulanic acid, a β-lactamase inhibitor. This drug combination is commonly called co-amoxiclav.

Spectrum of activity 

It is a moderate-spectrum, bacteriolytic, β-lactam antibiotic in the aminopenicillin family used to treat susceptible Gram-positive and Gram-negative bacteria. It is usually the drug of choice within the class because it is better-absorbed, following oral administration, than other β-lactam antibiotics.
In general, Streptococcus, Bacillus subtilis, Enterococcus, Haemophilus, Helicobacter, and Moraxella are susceptible to amoxicillin, whereas Citrobacter, Klebsiella and Pseudomonas aeruginosa are resistant to it. Some E. coli and most clinical strains of Staphylococcus aureus have developed resistance to amoxicillin to varying degrees.

Adverse effects

Adverse effects are similar to those for other β-lactam antibiotics, including nausea, vomiting, rashes, and antibiotic-associated colitis. Loose bowel movements (diarrhea) may also occur. Rarer adverse effects include mental changes, lightheadedness, insomnia, confusion, anxiety, sensitivity to lights and sounds, and unclear thinking. Immediate medical care is required upon the first signs of these adverse effects.

The onset of an allergic reaction to amoxicillin can be very sudden and intense; emergency medical attention must be sought as quickly as possible. The initial phase of such a reaction often starts with a change in mental state, skin rash with intense itching (often beginning in fingertips and around groin area and rapidly spreading), and sensations of fever, nausea, and vomiting. Any other symptoms that seem even remotely suspicious must be taken very seriously.  However, more mild allergy symptoms, such as a rash, can occur at any time during treatment, even up to a week after treatment has ceased.  For some people allergic to amoxicillin, the adverse effects can be fatal due to anaphylaxis.

Use of the amoxicillin/clavulanic acid combination for more than one week has caused a drug-induced immunoallergic-type hepatitis in some patients. Young children having ingested acute overdoses of amoxicillin manifested lethargy, vomiting, and renal dysfunction.

There is poor reporting of adverse effects of amoxicillin from clinical trials. For this reason, the severity and frequency of adverse effects from amoxicillin is probably higher than reported from clinical trials.

Nonallergic rash
Between 3 and 10% of children taking amoxicillin (or ampicillin) show a late-developing (>72 hours after beginning medication and having never taken penicillin-like medication previously) rash, which is sometimes referred to as the "amoxicillin rash". The rash can also occur in adults and may rarely be a component of the DRESS syndrome.

The rash is described as maculopapular or morbilliform (measles-like; therefore, in medical literature, it is called "amoxicillin-induced morbilliform rash".). It starts on the trunk and can spread from there. This rash is unlikely to be a true allergic reaction and is not a contraindication for future amoxicillin usage, nor should the current regimen necessarily be stopped. However, this common amoxicillin rash and a dangerous allergic reaction cannot easily be distinguished by inexperienced persons, so a healthcare professional is often required to distinguish between the two.

A nonallergic amoxicillin rash may also be an indicator of infectious mononucleosis. Some studies indicate about 80–90% of patients with acute Epstein–Barr virus infection treated with amoxicillin or ampicillin develop such a rash.

Interactions 
Amoxicillin may interact with these drugs:
 Anticoagulants (dabigatran, warfarin).
 Cancer treatment (methotrexate).
 Uricosuric drugs.
 Typhoid vaccine
 Probenecid reduces renal excretion and increases the blood levels of amoxicillin.
 Oral contraceptives may become less effective.
 Allopurinol (gout treatment).

Pharmacology
Amoxicillin (α-amino-p-hydroxybenzyl penicillin) is a semisynthetic derivative of penicillin with a structure similar to ampicillin but with better absorption when taken by mouth, thus yielding higher concentrations in blood and in urine.  Amoxicillin diffuses easily into tissues and body fluids. It will cross the placenta and is excreted into breastmilk in small quantities. It is metabolized by the liver and excreted into the urine. It has an onset of 30 minutes and a half-life of 3.7 hours in newborns and 1.4 hours in adults.

Amoxicillin attaches to the cell wall of susceptible bacteria and results in their death. It also is a bactericidal compound. It is effective against streptococci, pneumococci, enterococci, Haemophilus influenzae, Escherichia coli, Proteus mirabilis, Neisseria meningitidis, Neisseria gonorrhoeae, Shigella, Chlamydia trachomatis, Salmonella, Borrelia burgdorferi, and Helicobacter pylori. As a derivative of ampicillin, amoxicillin is a member of the penicillin family and, like penicillins, is a β-lactam antibiotic. It inhibits cross-linkage between the linear peptidoglycan polymer chains that make up a major component of the bacterial cell wall.
It has two ionizable groups in the physiological range (the amino group in alpha-position to the amide carbonyl group and the carboxyl group).

History

Amoxicillin was one of several semisynthetic derivatives of 6-aminopenicillanic acid (6-APA) developed by the Beecham Group in the 1960s. It became available in 1972 and was the second aminopenicillin to reach the market (after ampicillin in 1961). Co-amoxiclav became available in 1981.

Society and culture

Economics

Amoxicillin is relatively inexpensive. In 2022, a survey of 8 generic antibiotics commonly prescribed in the United States found their average cost to be about $42.67, while amoxicillin was sold for $12.14 on average.

Modes of delivery 
Pharmaceutical manufacturers make amoxicillin in trihydrate form, for oral use available as capsules, regular, chewable and dispersible tablets, syrup and pediatric suspension for oral use, and as the sodium salt for intravenous administration.

An extended-release is available. The intravenous form of amoxicillin is not sold in the United States. When an intravenous aminopenicillin is required in the United States, ampicillin is typically used. When there is an adequate response to ampicillin, the course of antibiotic therapy may often be completed with oral amoxicillin.

Research with mice indicated successful delivery using intraperitoneally injected amoxicillin-bearing microparticles.

Names

"Amoxicillin" is the International Nonproprietary Name (INN), British Approved Name (BAN), and United States Adopted Name (USAN), while "amoxycillin" is the Australian Approved Name (AAN).

Amoxicillin is one of the semisynthetic penicillins discovered by former pharmaceutical company Beecham Group. The patent for amoxicillin has expired, thus amoxicillin and co-amoxiclav preparations are marketed under various brand names across the world.

Veterinary uses
Amoxicillin is also sometimes used as an antibiotic for animals.  The use of amoxicillin for animals intended for human consumption (chickens, cattle, and swine for example) has been approved.

References

Further reading

External links 
 

Carboxylic acids
Enantiopure drugs
GSK plc brands
Lyme disease
Penicillins
Phenethylamines
Phenols
Wikipedia medicine articles ready to translate
World Health Organization essential medicines